Baeckea linifolia, commonly known as swamp baeckea, weeping baeckea or flax-leaf heath myrtle, is a species of flowering plant in the family Myrtaceae and is endemic to eastern Australia. It is an erect shrub with linear leaves and small white flowers with eight to fifteen stamens.

Description
There are eight to fifteen stamens with curved filaments, none of which is opposite the petals. The flat-topped ovary has two cells.

Taxonomy and naming
Baeckea linifolia was first formally described in 1807 by Edward Rudge in Transactions of the Linnean Society of London from a specimen collected "near Port Jackson". The specific epithet (linifolia) is derived from the Latin words linum  ("flax") and folium ("leaf"), giving a compound Latin adjective which describes the plant as having leaves like those of flax.

Distribution and habitat
Swamp baeckea grows in heath in damp places, often near waterfalls and gullies and is found along the coast and adjacent ranges from south-east Queensland through New South Wales to the Cann River in north-eastern Victoria where it is rare.

Victorian plants typically have smaller, more rigid leaves in comparison with plants found in New South Wales and Queensland, and were previously included in Baeckea linifolia var. brevifolia F.Muell. ex Benth.

Use in horticulture
This baeckea is reasonably well known in gardens and is a hardy plant in well-drained soil in a sunny or part-shaped situation. Once established it is moderately frost- and drought-tolerant.

References

External links 
 Baeckea linifolia Occurrence data from the Australasian Virtual Herbarium

Flora of New South Wales
linifolia
Flora of Queensland
Flora of Victoria (Australia)
Taxa named by Edward Rudge
Plants described in 1807